Cammy MacGregor and Catherine Suire were the defending champions, but none competed this year.

Patty Fendick and Meredith McGrath won the title by defeating Yayuk Basuki and Nana Miyagi 7–6(7–0), 3–6, 6–3 in the final.

Seeds

Draw

Draw

References

External links
 Official results archive (ITF)
 Official resulta archive (WTA)

Doubles
Volvo Women's Open - Doubles
 in women's tennis